Babaji is an Indian honorific that means "Father", usually with great respect or to a Priest. It may also refer to:

People
 Baba Ji Maharaj, name is chod for Baba Jaimal Singh (born July 1878), Founder and first Satguru of Radha Soami Satsang Beas
 Babaji, name is used for Sardar Gurinder Singh Dhillon Ji (born 1 August 1954), spiritual teacher
 Babaji, affectionate name for Shivarudra Balayogi (born 1954), yogi and self realized master
 Babaji, a name for Baba Virsa Singh Ji, founder of the Gobind Sadan Institute
 Babaji Maharaji or Hariakhan Baba (active 1861–1924), a yogi who taught throughout northern India near the Himalayas
 Gaurakisora Dasa Babaji (1838–1915), a well-known acharya from the Gaudiya Vaishnava tradition of Hinduism 
 Haidakhan Babaji, a teacher who appeared in northern India and taught publicly from 1970–1984
 Mahavatar Babaji, referred to by Paramahansa Yogananda in his best-selling Autobiography of a Yogi

Other uses
 "Babaji", a song from the album Even in the Quietest Moments... by Supertramp
 Babaji, Helmand, a rural suburb of Lashkargah that was the center of Operation Panther's Claw in 2009 during the War in Afghanistan 
 Little Babaji, a reworking of the children's book The Story of Little Black Sambo